Rosa Colosimo (born 25 June 1949 in Tropea, Italy) is an Australian film producer.

Career
Colosimo was born in Calabria, Italy, and moved to Melbourne, Australia with her family in 1951, where her parents ran a greengrocer's shop. She obtained a Bachelor of Arts from Melbourne University along with a Diploma of Education and began teaching Italian. She owned the only Italian book shop in the Southern hemisphere and became quite successful.

Colosimo became involved in the film industry by distributing Italian films for Australia in the early 80s before turning producer.

She was one of the most prolific film producers in Australia in the late 80s despite a lack of support from the funding bodies - all of her movies were made with private money. She was accused of using Mafia money on by someone on the board of Film Victoria, which Colosimo denied. She pioneered co-production with Italy.

Most of her movies concerned the Italian Australian community in Melbourne. Colosimo:
Producing is constantly stimulating. One of the most satisfying things about it is that while it is demanding, exhausting and tedious, it is ultimately achievable. I really do get excited by the potential of a story or a script. A project constantly shifts for me. I never get bored. It suits me to be in a work environment which is very intense and then to have space for myself in between.

Select credits
The Martini Family (1979) (short) - producer
Moving Out (1982) - production consultant
Waterfront (1983) (mini series) - production consultant
The Still Point (1986) - producer, writer
Options (1986) (documentary) - producer, writer
The Top Half (1986) (short) - writer, director
Sons of Bitches (1987) (docudrama)
Hungry Heart (1987) - producer
Blowing Hot and Cold (1988) - producer, co-writer
Damned Whores and Evil Bitches (1988) (documentary) - director, producer, writer
Postcards from Italy (1989) (documentary) - producer, writer
A Sting in the Tale (1989) - producer
Closer and Closer Apart (1989) - producer
Jigsaw (1989) - producer
A Kink in the Picasso (1990) - executive producer
Postcards from Italy (1990) (documentary) - producer, writer
On My Own (1991) - executive producer
Merchant of Dreams (1994) (documentary) - producer, writer
The India Connection (1995) (documentary) - producer, writer
Words Into Action (1995) (documentary) - producer, writer
OllieRom (1997) (CD-ROM) - consultant
Ninja Penguins (2000) (internet) - executive producer
Ineractive Flesh (2000) (internet) - executive producer
WOW/NOW (2000) (internet) - executive producer

Unmade projects
Daniel in the Lions' Den Discovers Among the Aboriginies in Terra Australia Only Sons of Bitches Can Save the World - from a script by Colleen McCullough
Red Rain (circa 1992) - a "psycho-sexual thriller", an Australian-Italian-Canadian-Japanese co-production to star Jennifer Beals and Russell Crowe from Colosimo's own script
The Von Kessell Dossier (circa 1992)

References

Further reading
Stratton, David, The Avocado Plantation: Boom and Bust in the Australian Film Industry, Pan MacMillan, 1990 p89

External links
 
Winding Road Entertainment (her current company]
Rosa Colosimo credits at Screen Australia

Australian film producers
Living people
1949 births